Eremopoa is a genus of Eurasian and Egyptian plants in the grass family.

 Species
 Eremopoa altaica (Trin.) Roshev. - Egypt, European Russia, Asia from Sinai to Tibet + Xinjiang
 Eremopoa attalica H.Scholz - Turkey
 Eremopoa capillaris R.R.Mill - Turkey, Syria, Lebanon
 Eremopoa mardinensis R.R.Mill - Turkey
 Eremopoa medica H.Scholz - Iran
 Eremopoa nephelochloides Roshev. - Iran
 Eremopoa persica (Trin.) Roshev. - Middle East, Caucasus, Saudi Arabia, Afghanistan, Iran, Pakistan, Tajikistan, Turkmenistan, Jammu & Kashmir

References

Poaceae genera
Pooideae